Hereford Independent School District is a public school district based in Hereford, Texas (USA).  In 2009, the school district was rated "academically acceptable" by the Texas Education Agency.

Schools
Hereford High School (Grades 9-12)
The school mascot (the whiteface) is named for the distinctive facial feature of the Hereford cattle breed for which the school and city are named.
Hereford Preparatory Academy (Grade 8)
Hereford Junior High (Grades 6 & 7) 
 HJH met AYP  (Adequate Yearly Progress ) for the 2011–2012 school year 
Aikman Elementary (Grades K-5)
Bluebonnet Elementary (Grades K-5)
Northwest Elementary (Grades K-5)
West Central Elementary (Grades K-5)

References

External links
Hereford ISD

School districts in Deaf Smith County, Texas
School districts in Parmer County, Texas
School districts in Castro County, Texas